"Gets Me Through" is the first track from the 2001 album Down to Earth by heavy metal vocalist Ozzy Osbourne in which he thanks his fans and attempts to set the record straight that his stage persona is precisely that and nothing more, stating, "I'm not the Anti-Christ or the Iron Man".

The single peaked at number eighteen on the UK Singles Chart and number two on Billboard's Mainstream Rock Tracks chart. In Metal Edge magazine's 2001 Readers' Choice Awards, it won "Music Video of the Year" and tied with Slipknot's "Left Behind" for "Song of the Year."

Music video
Two versions of the video exist. The first version was banned from MTV, due to it featuring images of flames, destruction, and a room of doves being killed and bleeding to death. After the terrorist attacks on September 11, 2001, Osbourne made a cut version of the video, removing most of the flames and destruction, as well as the dove scene, though a clip featuring a television set exploding was still kept in.

Personnel
Ozzy Osbourne - vocals
Zakk Wylde - guitar
Robert Trujillo - bass
Mike Bordin - drums
Tim Palmer - keyboards

Music Video

Director: Jonas Åkerlund

References 

Ozzy Osbourne songs
2001 singles
Songs written by Ozzy Osbourne
Songs written by Tim Palmer
2001 songs
Music videos directed by Jonas Åkerlund